James Gordon Sr. (August 2, 1750-September 29, 1796) was a planter, military officer and politician in Lancaster County, Virginia. The son of a Scots-Irish merchant who emigrated to Virginia's Northern Neck, he became one of Lancaster County's representatives at the convention that wrote the first Virginia constitution in 1776, as well as the first Virginia House of Delegates, and supported ratification at the Virginia Ratification Convention of 1788. His daughter married his nephew, who became known as James Gordon, Jr. and also served in the Virginia House of Delegates as well as voted for ratification at the 1788 Virginia Convention. He inherited a plantation which he called Gordonville and operated using enslaved labor, but which his heirs sold to a family who renamed it Verville, which is now on the National Register of Historic Places.

References

1750 births
1796 deaths
Members of the Virginia House of Delegates
People from Lancaster County, Virginia